Aurland is a municipality in the county of Vestland, Norway. It is located on the south side of the Sognefjorden in the traditional district of Sogn. The administrative center is the village of Aurlandsvangen. Other villages include Bakka, Flåm, Undredal, and Gudvangen.

The  municipality is the 60th largest by area out of the 356 municipalities in Norway. Aurland is the 293rd most populous municipality in Norway with a population of 1,766.

In 2016, the chief of police for Vestlandet formally suggested a reconfiguration of police districts and stations. He proposed that the police station in Aurland be closed.

General information

Aurland was established as a municipality on 1 January 1838 (see formannskapsdistrikt law). The original municipality was identical to the Aurland parish (prestegjeld) with the sub-parishes of Aurlandsvangen, Flåm, and Undredal. In 1859, the sub-parish of Nærøy was created by separating it from the sub-parish of Undredal. The municipal borders have not changed since 1838.

Name
The name Aurland derives from the Old Norse words aurr (which means "gravel") plus land (which means "land" or "district").

Coat of arms

Aurland's coat of arms was granted on 22 May 1987. The arms depict a silver colored goat's head on a blue background. A goat was considered an appropriate symbol for the municipality since the area is famed for its production of goat cheese and goat farming.

Churches
The Church of Norway has four parishes within the municipality of Aurland. It is part of the Sogn prosti (deanery) in the Diocese of Bjørgvin.

Government
All municipalities in Norway, including Aurland, are responsible for primary education (through 10th grade), outpatient health services, senior citizen services, unemployment and other social services, zoning, economic development, and municipal roads. The municipality is governed by a municipal council of elected representatives, which in turn elect a mayor.  The municipality falls under the Sogn og Fjordane District Court and the Gulating Court of Appeal.

Municipal council
The municipal council  of Aurland is made up of 17 representatives that are elected to four year terms. The party breakdown of the council is as follows:

Mayor
The mayor  of a municipality in Norway is a representative of the majority party of the municipal council who is elected to lead the council. The mayors of Aurland (incomplete list):
2019–present: Trygve Skjerdal (Sp)
2011–2019: Noralv Distad (H)
2003–2011: Olav Ellingsen (Sp)

History
The earliest inhabitants lived by hunting and fishing until they gradually started farming about 2,000 years ago. Agriculture is still important with the rich valley floors and abundant mountain pastures. As in all of western Norway, the area was overpopulated in the middle 19th century, and cotters were forced to clear land far up the mountainsides. This difficulty led to emigration and in the 20-year period after 1845, 1,050 people moved out of the community—most of them moving to America.

Tourism came to the community as early as the middle of the 19th century, in the form of sport fishing and hunting. Tourists from England were dominant during this time and one can still find English names for mountaintops, hunting cabins, and fishing holes.

Later, a different type of tourist came to the region. These tourists came to enjoy the natural beauty of the area. These tourists created a need for jobs in the form of transportation and lodging. Three or four ships would anchor in the Nærøyfjord at a time which created the need for scores of horse-drawn carriages to take the tourists up to Stalheim hotel, located just over the border in Voss municipality to the southwest.

Geography

These are branches that flow off of the world's longest and deepest fjord, the Sognefjorden.

Aurland is bordered by four municipalities in Vestland county: Lærdal to the north-east and Vik to the west, Voss to the south-west, and Ulvik to the south. It is also bordered by one municipality in Viken county: Hol to the south-east.

Most of the area is composed of fjords and mountains with small populated areas concentrated in the lower river valleys, the largest of which is the Aurlandsdalen. The main village areas include Aurlandsvangen, Gudvangen, Undredal, Flåm, and Vassbygdi.

There are two permanent glaciers in Aurland: Storskavlen and Blåskavlen.

The Aurlandsfjellet mountains separate Aurland from the neighboring municipality to the east, Lærdal. The Lærdal Tunnel, the longest in the world as of 2014, cuts through the mountains connecting the two municipalities. The Gudvanga Tunnel connects the villages of Gudvangen and Undredal in southwestern Aurland.

Nature

Climate
Aurland has a typical inland climate with mild winters at the lower levels, early springs, and warm summers. In comparison, Bergen has  of precipitation per year.

Vegetation

Aurland has rich and varied flora, which is more typical of eastern rather than western Norway. The mountain plant life is especially rich since the bedrock contains calcium rich deposits of phyllite.

Geology
The oldest bedrock in Aurland are Precambrian basement rocks which crop out in tectonic windows in the north-eastern part of the municipality. This basement unit is mainly composed of granites, granodiorites and gneisses and is overlain by a nappe unit of cambro-silurian phyllite and mica schist of varying thickness. This is in turn overlain by a second nappe unit, called the Jotundekket (“Jokun Nappe”), which consists of Precambrian, mainly magmatic rocks which are more or less metamorphosed into gneisses and amphibolite.

Part of the scenery took its shape 9,000 years ago, at the end of the ice age. The ice's advance was either halted or continued, according to the climatic conditions, and moraine ridges and gravel terraces were deposited along the glacier front. They are still visible today south of the Flåm church.

On the western side of the Aurlandsfjord, there is rock that was pushed up into mountain ranges several million years ago. The fjord itself was gouged out of an earlier valley. Aurlandsvangen is typical of the lower areas, lying on an old river delta—the land is very flat and fertile. The mountainsides are steep causing frequent rock slides and avalanches.

The lakes Nyhellervatnet and Fretheimsdalsvatnet are located in Aurland.

Attractions

UNESCO World Heritage Site
The West Norwegian Fjords of Geirangefjord and Nærøyfjord were added to UNESCO's World Heritage Site list in 2005. The World Heritage Site possesses a unique combination of glacial landforms at the same time as each area is characterised by its own outstanding beauty. The Nærøyfjord areas in this site stretch through the municipalities of Aurland, Lærdal, Vik, and Voss.

Aurlandsdalen Valley

The Aurlandsdalen valley is a well known hiking trail in Norway with its fabulous nature and contrasting countryside. The valley is rich in history and packed with culture. One can take the hike in several stages: From Geiteryggen where the path starts, it is a four-hour hike to Steinbergdalen. There are beautiful views of mountain peaks, snow glaciers, and lakes. In Steinbergdalen you will find Steinbergdalen mountain lodge which opened in 1895.

Flåmsbana Railway
The Flåm Railway is a masterpiece in engineering which is one of the most exciting railway journeys in the world. It has 20 tunnels with a total length of almost . About 80% of the Flåm railway has a maximum gradient of 5.5%. To cope with the enormous change in height over such a short stretch, the track runs partly through tunnels which spiral in and out of the mountainside. The gradient is quite exceptional for a normal railway and the carriages are fitted with five different brake systems, any one of which is sufficient to stop the train.

Undredal Stavkyrkje
The Undredal Stave Church is a simple, small one-nave church that was built around 1150. It is located in the village of Undredal. It is one of the oldest preserved stave churches in Norway.

Vangen Kyrkje
The Vangen Church was built in 1202. The church is built in the early Gothic style influenced by English architecture. A document written in 1714 tells us that English merchants used to stay in Aurland during long periods to buy different articles and they are supposed to have taken part in the building of the church. Most likely they would have been the master builders.

In 1725, the Danish-Norwegian government was experiencing financial problems and King Frederick IV sold the church. The church remained as private property until the late 19th century. Then the municipality bought Vangen church back for 500 kroner.

At the last restoration in 1926, the original colors and designs were uncovered. Then the ceiling was taken away and the baldachin over the pulpit was brought back again. A new altarpiece was made. The Norwegian artist Emanuel Vigeland made the stained glass windows (two of the windows in the chancel illustrate the Parable of the Prodigal Son, and the one in the middle is Jesus Christ, the Savior).

Sightseeing
Kjelfossen is a waterfall located near the village of Gudvangen
Kjosfossen and Rjoandefossen are waterfalls that can be seen from the Flåmsbana railway
The Stegastein viewpoint was constructed in 2006 with views of the surrounding fjords and valleys.

Notable people 
 Absalon Pederssøn Beyer (ca. 1528 in Aurland – 1575) a Norwegian author, lecturer and Lutheran clergyman
 Ragnvald Gjerløw (1853 in Aurland – 1936) a Norwegian priest and writer
 Per Sivle (1857 in Flåm – 1904) a Norwegian poet, novelist and newspaper editor
 Ragnvald Winjum (1917–1965) a Norwegian jurist, politician, farmer and attorney; lived in Aurland from 1953 and became the Mayor of Aurland municipality
 Keldian (formed 2005 in Aurland) a Norwegian power metal band

References

External links

Municipal fact sheet from Statistics Norway 
Aurland and Lærdal Tourist Board
Myrdal
Official Website of Aurland
Map hiking Skarvheimen

 
Municipalities of Vestland
1838 establishments in Norway